Brazilian submarine Humaitá (S20) was an Oberon-class submarine in the Brazilian Navy.

Design and construction

The submarine, built by Vickers Shipbuilding and Engineering at their shipyard in Barrow, was laid down on 3 November 1970, and launched on 5 October 1971. She was commissioned into the Brazilian Navy on 18 June 1973.

Operational history

Decommissioning and fate

Humaitá left naval service in 1996.

See also
 Ships of the Brazilian Navy

References

External links
 The Submarine Heritage Centre - Brazilian "O" Class

Oberon-class submarines of the Brazilian Navy
Ships built in Barrow-in-Furness
1971 ships